Phil Seaton (born 4 January 1957) is a former Australian rules footballer who played with Melbourne in the Victorian Football League (VFL). 

Originally from Tongala, he moved to Bendigo Teacher's College in 1977 and played in Sandhurst's 1977 Bendigo Football League premiership that year before three years with Melbourne. Seaton then played with Wangaratta Rovers for several years, representing the Ovens & Murray Football League and the Victorian Country Football League in 1981  and 1982.

Seaton was runner up to Rod Coelli from Albury in the 1981 Ovens and Murray Football League Morris Medal.

Seaton returned to Tongala to play in the Goulburn Valley Football League in 1984.

Notes

External links 		

Profile at Demonwiki
1981 VCFL team photo
1982 VCFL team photo

		
1957 births
Living people
Australian rules footballers from Victoria (Australia)		
Melbourne Football Club players
Sandhurst Football Club players